Austrorossia is a genus of bobtail squid encompassing five species.

Species
Genus Austrorossia
Austrorossia antillensis, Antilles bobtail squid
Austrorossia australis
Austrorossia bipapillata
Austrorossia enigmatica *
Austrorossia mastigophora

References

External links

Bobtail squid
Cephalopod genera
Taxa named by Samuel Stillman Berry